Gayathry Govindharaj (born 27 April 1991) is an Indian athlete who competes in the 100 metres hurdles and Triple jump events. She is supported by Olympic Gold Quest, a not-for-profit foundation that identifies and supports Indian athletes.

Early life 
Gayathri comes from a small village near Tiruchi called Ariyalur. She comes from a humble background and before she gained fame, her family found it difficult to make ends meet. Due to her economic background her parents could not afford to provide her a formal training and she says in an interview with The Indian Express, "My parents recollect that I used to run around a lot during my childhood. In school, I used to participate in every athletic event in every tournament."

After securing 91 per cent in her twelfth standard, she came to Chennai to study computer-engineering from St Joseph’s College of Engineering.

Career and achievements 
After participating in various inter college sports events, she gained fame through the 18th Zone Junior inter-State athletic Championship (2006) in Raichur. She won gold in U-16 100M hurdles in this. She also broke Poonam Belliappa's 11 year old record of 14.40 seconds in the under-18 category in the year 2016. This was followed by her another 14.04 seconds in 2008 and in Mysore she beat her own record by 0.02 seconds.

Her left knee was injured during the triple jump event of the Commonwealth Games 2010 that happened in New Delhi. After being operated on her left leg, she said in an interview with The Hindu that she has been practicing hard to be a part of sports once again.

References

External links
 
 Gayathry Govindharaj at Olympic Gold Quest

1991 births
Living people
Athletes from Tamil Nadu
Sportspeople from Chennai
Indian female sprinters
Indian female triple jumpers
21st-century Indian women
21st-century Indian people
Indian female hurdlers
Athletes (track and field) at the 2010 Commonwealth Games
Sportswomen from Tamil Nadu
South Asian Games gold medalists for India
South Asian Games medalists in athletics
Commonwealth Games competitors for India